Olavo Rodrigues Barbosa, best known as Nena, (11 July 1923 – 17 November 2010) was a Brazilian former football player. He was born in Porto Alegre, Rio Grande do Sul.

From 1940 to 1949 the defender played with SC Internacional in Porto Alegre and won with the club eight state championships. In 1949 he moved to Associação Portuguesa de Desportos in São Paulo with which he won the Torneio Rio – São Paulo of 1952 and 1955. He ended his playing career with the club in 1958 but stayed on as auxiliary coach and functionary. In the 1960s he worked as youth coach with SC Corinthians Paulista.

Between 1947 and 1952 he played five times for the Brazil national team. He was also part of the Brazilian roster of the 1950 World Cup where Brazil finished as runner up, but did not get to play.

In 2003, he moved with his wife to Goiânia, capital of the state Goiás in the interior of Brazil. There the father of five children died in 2010 from lung cancer.

Clubs
 Internacional: 1940–1949
 Portuguesa: 1949–1958

Honours
 Campeonato Gaúcho: eight times (1940, 1941, 1942, 1943, 1944, 1945, 1947 and 1948).
 Torneio Rio – São Paulo: 1952, 1955

References

1923 births
2010 deaths
Footballers from Porto Alegre
Brazilian footballers
Sport Club Internacional players
Associação Portuguesa de Desportos players
Brazil international footballers
1950 FIFA World Cup players
Association football defenders